James H. Baker may refer to:

 James H. Baker (politician) (1829–1913), politician who was Ohio Secretary of State and Minnesota Secretary of State
 James H. Baker (DOD), American foreign policy advisor
 James Baker (university president) (1848–1914), president of the University of Colorado.